Abbatucci is a surname of Corsican and Italian origin, especially from Zicavo. Notable people with the surname include:

 Jacques Pierre Abbatucci (military officer) (1723–1813), Corsican officer
 Jacques Pierre Abbatucci (minister) (1791–1857) Corsican-born French politician 
 Jean Charles Abbatucci (1770–1796), Corsican-born French general 
 Jean-Charles Abbatucci (politician) (1816–1885), Corsican politician 

Surnames of Italian origin